Glasgay! Festival was a gay, lesbian, bisexual and transgender arts festival in Glasgow, Scotland.

From 1993 to 2014 it was part of the diversity of Glasgow's cultural scene, an annual Lesbian, Gay, Bisexual and Transgender Arts Festival held usually in October/November, formerly organised by GALA Scotland Ltd.

History
Cordelia Ditton, the co-director of Gay Sweatshop, founded Glasgay! in response to the Section 28 legislation in 1988, which banned the promotion of homosexuality as an acceptable lifestyle. Ditton partnered with Glasgow-based freelance arts administrator Dominic D'Angelo in 1991.

The festival launched on Saturday 30 October 1993 as a biennial event with the goal of making the lesbian and gay communities of Glasgow more visible and changing public opinion about lesbian and gay people. Over 26,000 people attended between 30 October and the festival's end on 6 November. There was some backlash to the festival, especially in regards to the festival being funded by public money.

The 1995 festival launched on 27 October 1995. The operating company, GALA Scotland Ltd, was established in late 1995, after Ditton stepped down. The new board of directors was led by D'Angelo.

The festival was funded mainly on a year to year basis by the Scottish Arts Council and, subsequently its successor, Creative Scotland and Glasgow City Council. From 2007 to 2014 it enjoyed regular three-year funding agreements from the Scottish Arts Council and Creative Scotland. However, in 2015 this funding agreement was not renewed. The company entered a period of funding transition, during which they retired the festival. The company rebranded as Outspoken Arts Scotland. 

The administrative, artistic, press & PR archive of the Glasgay! Festival 1993–2014 was transferred to Glasgow University's Scottish Theatre Archive in early 2018.

Past work
The company commissioned 16 new works for theatre and funded over 40 co-productions since 2006.  It worked with over 400 artists in its lifetime and regularly engaged both established mature talent as well as championing emergent talent.

In its history the festival has worked with many of the top gay and lesbian artists in the world.  Names such as Ian McKellen, Simon Fanshawe, Donna McPhail, Edwin Morgan, Jackie Kay, Rhona Cameron, Annie Sprinkle, Penny Arcade, Bette Bourne, Diamanda Galas, Neil Bartlett, Scott Capurro, Pam Ann, Four Poofs and a Piano, Lypsinka, Louise Welsh, Marc Almond, Alan Carr, Zoë Strachan, Stewart Laing, and John Waters are amongst the many others that have graced Glasgow's stages.

Commissions

Commissioned Work (Year) Writer/Creators
1. DONALD DOES DUSTY (2006) by Diane Torr
2. Tamburlaine Must Die (2007) by Louise Welsh
3. ELYSIAN FIELDS (2008) by Derek McLuckie
4. INSIDEOUT (Exhibition) (2009) by Dani Marti
5. Jesus, Queen of Heaven (2009) by Jo Clifford
6. A CHILD MADE OF LOVE (2009) by Matthew McVarish
7. MEMORY CELLS (2009) by Louise Welsh
8. Playing Houses (2009) by Martin O'Connor
9. THE MAW BROON MONOLOGUES (2009) by Jackie Kay
10. PANIC PATTERNS (2010) by Louise Welsh
11. THE BRIDGE (2010) by Wendy Miller & Rachel Amey
12. EDWIN MORGAN'S DREAMS AND OTHER NIGHTMARES (2011) by Liz Lochhead
13. Cured (2013) by Stef Smith
14. THE NEW MAW BROON MONOLOGUES (2013) by Jackie Kay
15. WILFUL FORGETTING (2013) by Donna Rutherford with Martin O'Connor
16. CARDINAL SINNE (2014) by Raymond Burke

Main venues
Venues included the Glasgow Film Theatre (GFT), the CCA, Tron Theatre, Citizens Theatre, The Arches, King's Theatre, Theatre Royal, RSAMD, St Andrew's in the Square, Art School, The Stand, Kelvingrove Art Gallery and Museum and Glasgow's gay scene.

See also 
Culture in Glasgow
LGBT rights in Scotland
LGBT rights in the United Kingdom
LGBT Youth Scotland

References

External links 
Outspoken Arts Scotland Website
Press Cuttings Archive 
Glasgay! Festival 1993-2014 Archive Publication

Tourist attractions in Glasgow
LGBT events in Scotland
Arts festivals in Scotland
Annual events in Glasgow
1993 establishments in Scotland
Recurring events established in 1993
Festivals in Glasgow
Theatre festivals in Scotland
Autumn events in Scotland
LGBT festivals in the United Kingdom
LGBT culture in Glasgow